Juha Järvenpää (born May 11, 1989) is a Finnish professional ice hockey goaltender. He currently plays for Dornbirn Bulldogs in Austria.

Järvenpää made his Sm-liiga debut playing with Ässät during the 2010–11 SM-liiga season.

References

External links

1989 births
People from Noormarkku
Living people
Ässät players
Ilves players
Finnish ice hockey goaltenders
Sportspeople from Satakunta